Nina Simone was an American singer, songwriter, pianist, and arranger.

Albums
This is a list of Simone's official albums, both studio and live, issued with her explicit co-operation.

Additional album releases

Singles
Nina Simone’s life as a recording artist can be divided into three phases: early period (1957-64, corresponding to her albums with Bethlehem and Colpix); middle period (1964-74, corresponding to her albums with Philips and RCA); and late period (1974-2003, corresponding to her time either without a recording contract or with a multitude of different contracts). Simone died in 2003, and all releases after this are posthumous.

Singles: Early period (1959-64)

Colpix Torchlite Series singles

Simone's official final single for Colpix was "Little Liza Jane" in September 1963, as she then moved from that company to a new contract with Philips. However, later that year, Colpix released thirteen 7" singles all at the same time from Simone under a special imprint called the Colpix Torchlite Series.

Singles: Middle period (1964-74)

Singles: Late period (1974-2003)

Singles: Posthumous (2003 onward)

Notes

References

External links 

 
 

Discographies of American artists
Rhythm and blues discographies
Soul music discographies